Zawiść may refer to:
Zawiść, Opole Voivodeship (south Poland)
Zawiść, Orzesze in Silesian Voivodeship (south Poland)